Halpin–Tsai model is a mathematical model for the prediction of elasticity of composite material based on the geometry and orientation of the filler and the elastic properties of the filler and matrix. The model is based on the self-consistent field method although often consider to be empirical.

See also 
 Cadec-online.com implements the Halpin–Tsai model among others.

References
 J. C. Halpin Effect of Environmental Factors on Composite Materials, US Air Force Material Laboratory, Technical Report AFML-TR-67-423, June 1969
 J.C. Halpin and J. L. Kardos Halpin-Tsai equations:A review, Polymer Engineering and Science, 1976, v16, N5, pp 344-352
 Halpin-Tsai model on about.com

Composite materials
Continuum mechanics
Materials science